Krasnaya Zarya Leningrad was the previous name of two sports clubs in Saint Petersburg, Russia:

 BSK Saint Petersburg, bandy club
 FC Elektrosila Leningrad, football club